FK Spitamen is football club based in Navkat, Tajikistan, who've competed only once in the Tajik League, the top flight of football in Tajikistan, during the 2009 season.

History

Domestic history

References

Football clubs in Tajikistan